The Toubou or Tubu (from Old Tebu, meaning "rock people") are an ethnic group native to the Tibesti Mountains that inhabit the central Sahara in northern Chad, southern Libya and northeastern Niger. They live either as herders and nomads or as farmers near oases. Their society is clan-based, with each clan having certain oases, pastures and wells.

The Toubou are generally divided into two closely related groups: the Teda (or Téda, Toda, Tireh) and the Dazagara (or Dazzaga, Dazagada, Daza). They are believed to share a common origin and speak the Tebu languages, which are from the Saharan branch of the Nilo-Saharan language family. Tebu is divided further into two closely related languages, called Tedaga (Téda Toubou) and Dazaga (Dazaga Gouran). Of the two groups, the Daza, found to the south of the Teda, are more numerous.

The Toubou people are also referred to as the Tabu, Tebu, Tebou, Tibu, Tibbu, Toda, Todga, Todaga, Tubu, Tuda, Tudaga, or Gorane people. The Dazaga are sometimes referred to as Gouran (or Gorane, Goran, Gourane), an Arabian exonym. Many of Chad's leaders have been Toubou (Gouran), including presidents Goukouni Oueddei and Hissène Habré.

Distribution
The Toubou people have historically lived in northern Chad, northeastern Niger, and southern Libya. They have sometimes been called the "black nomads of the Sahara". They are distributed across a large area in the central Sahara, as well as the north-central Sahel. They are particularly found north of the Tibesti mountains, which in Old Tebu means "Rocky Mountains". The first syllable "Tu" refers to the Tibesti mountains, as known by the natives (Teda), and the second syllable "bo" refers to blood in the Kanembou language; thus, people from the Tibesti mountains are referred to as Tubou." Their name is derived from this.

The Teda are found primarily in the Sahara regions around the borders of southeast Libya, northeast Niger and northern Chad. They consider themselves a warrior people. The Dazagra live towards the Sahel region and are spread over much of north-central Chad. The Dazagra consist of numerous clans. Some major clans of the Dazagara, or Gouran, include the Anakaza, Choraga, Dazza, Djagada, Dogorda, Donza, Gaeda, Kamaya, Karra, Ketcherda, Kokorda, Mourdiya, Salmah, Wandja, Yirah and many more. The Dazagra cover the northern regions of Bourkou, the Ennedi Plateau, the Tibesti Mountains and Bahr el Gazel in the south. There is a diaspora community of several thousand Dazaga living in Omdurman, Sudan and a couple of thousand working in Jeddah, Saudi Arabia.

History

The ancient history of the Toubou people is unclear. They may be related to the 'Ethiopians' mentioned by Herodotus in 430 BCE, as a people being hunted by the Garamantes, but this is speculative, as Jean Chapelle argues. Furthermore, scholars such as Laurence P. Kirwan stress that the Garamantes and the Toubou seem to occupy the same lands. Which spans from the Fezzan (Phazania) as far south as Nubia. Further evidence is given by Harold MacMichael states that the Bayuda desert was still known as the desert of Goran; a name as MacMichael has shown, connected with the Kura'án of today. This reaffirms that the Kura'án (Goran) of today, occupy much of the same territory as the Garamantes once did.

In Islamic literature, the earliest mention as the Toubou people is perhaps that along with the Zaghawa people in an 8th-century text by Arabic scholar Ibn Qutaybah. The 9th century al-Khwarizmi mentions the Daza people (southern Toubou).

During the expansive era of Trans-Saharan trade, the Toubou inhabited lands which were frequently used by merchant caravans, specifically along the Kufra basin routes. It is unknown if the Toubou enganged with the caravans.

Genetics 
According to a study published in The American Journal of Human Genetics (Haber et al. 2016) that examined Y-DNA haplogroups from samples obtained from 75 Toubou men, haplogroups associated with paternal Eurasian ancestry were present at rates of 34% for R1b, 31% for T1a, and 1% for J1. The African associated haplogroup E-M78 were present at rates of 28%, while E-M81 appeared at a rate of 5%. The study also found that 20-30% of Toubou autosomal DNA was Eurasian in origin, and their African ancestral component was best represented by Laal-speaking populations. The most likely source of this Eurasian DNA, according to the analysis, would be a population originating among Near Eastern farmers during the Neolithic Revolution. In contrast, Near Eastern populations scored African ancestry at a rate of 7%-14% (Yemen) to 0.7%-5% (Lebanese Christians). Other ethnic groups in the Chad, such as the Sara people and the Laal speakers had considerably lower Eurasian admixture, at only 0.3%-2% (Sara) and 1.25%-4.5% (Laal).

Society

Livelihood
Toubou life centers on raising and herding their livestock, or on farming the scattered oases where they cultivate dates and grain and legumes. Their herds include dromedaries, goats, cattle, donkeys and sheep. The livestock is a major part of their wealth, and they trade the animals. The livestock is also used as a part of dowry payment during marriage, either as one where the groom's family agrees to pay to the bride's family in exchange for the bride, or, states Catherine Baroin, it is given by the bride's kin to supply the young couple with economic resources in order to start a family.

In a few places, the Toubou also mine salt and natron, a salt-like substance which is essential in nearly all components of Toubou life from medicinal purposes, as a mixture in chewing tobacco, preservation, tanning, soap production, textiles and for livestock. Literacy rates among the Toubou are quite low.

Clan
Many Toubou people still follow a semi-nomadic pastoralist lifestyle. Those who prefer a settled life typically live in palm-thatched, rectangular or cylindrical mud houses. The Toubou are patrilineal, with an elder male heading the lineage. The second order of Toubou kinship is to the clan.

According to Jean Chapelle, his book in Borkou has caused a significant degree of wrongdoing, a colonial officer of history specializing in Chadian ethnic groups, the clan system developed out of necessity. Nomadic life means being scattered throughout a region; therefore, belonging to a clan means that the individual is likely to find hospitable clan people in most settlements or camps of any size. 

A second factor is the maintenance of ties with the maternal clan. Although the maternal clan does not occupy the central place of the parental clan, it provides ties. The third factor is protective relationships at the primary residence.

Despite shared linguistic heritage, few institutions among the Toubou generate a broader sense of identity than the clan. Regional divisions do exist, however. During the colonial period (and since independence in 1960), Chadian administrations have conferred legality and legitimacy on these regional groupings by dividing the Toubou and Daza regions into corresponding territorial units called cantons and appointing chiefs to administer them.

Toubou legal customs are generally based on Islamic law, that allows restitution and revenge. Murder, for example, is settled directly between the families of the victim and the murderer. Toubou honour requires that someone from the victim's family try to kill the murderer or a relative; such efforts eventually end with negotiations to settle the matter. 

Reconciliation follows the payment of the Goroga (Islamic tenet of Diyya), or blood money. Among the Tomagra clan of the Teda people in the Tibesti region, there is a derde (spiritual head) who is recognized as the clan judge, and arbitrates conflict and levies sanctions.

Social stratification

The Toubou people, states Jean Chapelle, have been socially stratified with an embedded caste system. The three strata have consisted of the freemen with a right to own property, the artisanal castes and the slaves.

The endogamous caste of Azza (or Aza) among Toubou have the artisanal occupations, such as metal work, leather work, salt mining, well digging, dates farming, pottery and tailoring, and they have traditionally been despised and segregated by other strata of the Toubou, much like the Hadahid caste in southeastern Chad among the Zaghawa people. According to Paul Lovejoy – a professor of African History, the 19th century records show that these segregated Toubou castes followed the same customs and traditions as the rest of the Toubou, but they were independent in their politics and beliefs, much like the artisan castes found in many ethnic groups of western Chad such as the Kanembou, Yedina, Arab, Kouri and Danawa.

Marriage between a member of the Azza and a member from a different strata of the Toubou people has been culturally unacceptable. The Azza are Dazaga-speaking people who sprang from the Dazagara. The majority of Teda speak and understand Dazaga, however, the Dazagada do not always clearly grasp Tedaga. Dazaga is the most commonly used language in BET by all its inhabitants.

The lowest social strata were the slaves (Agara). Slaves entered Toubou Teda and Gourane Dazagada societies from raids and warfare on other ethnic groups in lands to their south. All slaves were the property of their masters, their caste was endogamous, and their status was inherited by birth.

The noble chief Kellei Chahami of Kamaya an agreement with the French colonists decreed the emancipation of all slaves in 1953 and suppressed the use of captives in the Borkou region, while slaves from the contiguous regions, such as Tibesti and Ennedi, uncovered the emancipation center located in Borkou. Several of these slaves escaped and sought refuge in Borkou under the Kamaya, where they also emancipated by the esteemed chief Kellei Chahami, who granted them the land which enabled them to settle and this quarter was originally called "Ni-Agaranga", which literally translates to "country of slaves" in the Faya-Largeau city. However, the Borkou municipality rechristened it "Quartier Huit" (Eighth Quarter) for euphemism. After the abolition of slavery in 1953, the chief Kellei Chahami admitted the descendants of former captives to the canton, where they were recognized as full members and can move around without restrictions and in this way, the last fraction of the Kamaya canton thus was established. Not only the captives were attached to the Kamaya canton, but all the foreigners who resided in Faya as well including: Fezzanais, Ouadaens, prostitutes, blacksmiths and etc., were also attached to the Kamaya canton. 
 
Toubou Teda allege and refer to their slaves as Kamadja, their authentic designation deliberately, which is a misinterpretation of Kamaya, who are grudgingly attempting to derogate the Toubou Gourane Kamaya clans' federation because the Kamaya's history was fabricated by the French colonists. In addition, the tone terms, such as Kamadja for the male plural and also it can be used as a general and Kamadji for the male singular, all of these terms can be used, although they have no meaning. The female singular Kamadjedo or Kamadjero is preposterous and nonsensical, while the plural form of the female term, Kamadjeda, has an exceedingly bizarre and illogical tone. The term "Kamadja" is somewhat stuck and fading on the ethnic group Kamaya which does not recognize itself in it and it was originated and peddled by the French colonists, however, it is believed to be misquoted, misconstrued, and distorted the letters "Y" to "J" or "Dj" in the identities of a multitude of clans, tribes, communities, rural areas, living creatures, and many more across virtually the entire nation of Chad and also the 1869 writings of Dr. Gustav Nichtigal contain references to various inaccuracies, such as the Yira clan as Jira, the Yenoa clan as Jenoa, the Yin oasis as Jin, and the Yarda oasis as Jarda, the Faya oasis as Faja, the Bidayet community as Bidajet, the Goli Yeskou as Goli Jeskou (Black snake), etc. Dr. G. Nichtigal gathered intelligence for the German government in order to colonize these regions; however, Chad became part of the French empire when they divided the African continent, and thus the French invaders exploited Dr. G. Nichtigal's works in order to invade Chad. In direct relation to the Kamadja term, neither the Tedaga nor the Dazaga languages have the term "Kamadja”. On the other hand, the significance of the designation Kamaya has value, meaning and history that derived from "Kama-Dro-Yédé", which refers to the valley's occupant of the Faya oasis in Kanem Dazaga's dialect, where "Kama" signifies valley, "Dro" signifies inside, and "Yédé" signifies a dweller. "Yé" signifies dwells and "Dé" is the signifier of a singular form which "Kama-Dro-Yédé" literally states "who dwells in the valley" of the palm grove of Faya oasis.  The clans of Kamaya were originally referred to as "Kamayada" where "Ya" means dwell and "Da" is the signifier of the plural form, while "Kamayédé" is a singular form that signifies an inhabitant of the valley of Faya palm grove oasis, since the suffix "Dé" is added to the singular form of "Yé”. Thus, Kamaya means the natives of the valley of the palm grove of Faya oasis. In Dazaga, the community is called "Kama-Yanga". Which means the Kamaya canton and the suffix "Ga" implies the dialect spoken by the Dazagada. In this language, the nationals of this canton are referred to as "Kamaye" (male singular), "Kamayedo" or "Kamayero" (female singular) and depends on the accents of specific regions and individuals, the suffix may be pronounced differently from “Do” to “Ro”, "Kamayeda" (female plural), and "Kamaya" (male plural and as a general).

Marriage
The Toubou Teda, in particular, forbids marriage between cousins, up to 9 generations unrelated, a tradition prevalent with many Muslim ethnic groups in Africa, however, the Gourane of Kanem, Bahr el-Ghazal, and certain clans of Borkou and Ennedi marry close cousins since it is not prohibited in the Quran and the Quran recommends cousin marriages, they also doubt the origins of individuals and misalliance.  A man may marry and have multiple wives according to Islamic tenets, however, this practice is only somewhat prevalent in Toubou society.

The ownership of land, animals, and resources takes several forms. Within an oasis or settled zone belonging to a particular clan, land, trees (usually date palms), and nearby wells may have different owners. Each family's rights to the use of particular plots of land are recognized by other clan members. Families also may have privileged access to certain wells and the right to a part of the harvest from the fields irrigated by their water. Within the clan and family contexts, individuals also may have personal claims to palm trees and animals.

Contemporary conditions

Chad 

Much of the political class of Chad are drawn from Dazaga. During the First Chadian Civil War (1966-1979), the derde came to occupy a more important position. In 1965 the Chadian government assumed direct authority over the Tibesti  Mountains, sending a military garrison and administrators to Bardaï, the capital of Tibesti Sub-prefecture. Within a year, abuses of authority had roused considerable opposition among the Toubou. The derde, Oueddei Kichidemi, recognized but little respected up to that time, protested the excesses, went into exile in Libya, and, with the support of Toubou students at the Islamic University of Bayda, became a symbol of opposition to the Chadian government. This role enhanced the position of the derde among the Toubou.

After 1967 the derde hoped to rally the Toubou to the National Liberation Front of Chad (FROLINAT). Moral authority became military authority shortly thereafter when his son, Goukouni Oueddei, became one of the leaders of the Second Liberation Army of FROLINAT. Goukouni was to become a national figure; he played an important role in the battles of N'Djamena in 1979 and 1980 and served as head of state for a time. Another northerner, Hissène Habré of the Dazagra, replaced Goukouni of the Teda in 1982, and lost eventually power to the Zaghawa Idriss Déby after 8 years.

Libya  

The Toubou minority in Libya suffered what has been described as "massive discrimination" both under the leadership of Muammar Gaddafi as well as after the Libyan civil war.

In a report released by the UNHCR, the Society for Threatened Peoples (STP) reported "massive discrimination" against the Toubou minority, which resides in the southeastern corner of the country around the oasis town of Kufra. In December 2007, the Gaddafi government stripped Toubou Libyans of their citizenship, claiming that they were not Libyans, but rather Chadians. In addition, local authorities denied Toubou people access to education and healthcare. In response, an armed group called the Toubou Front for the Salvation of Libya (TFSL) staged an uprising in November 2008 which lasted for five days and claimed 33 lives before being crushed by government security forces. Despite resistance and public condemnation, the Gaddafi regime continued its persecution of the Toubou minority in Libya. Beginning in November 2009, the government began a program of forced eviction and demolition of Toubou homes, rendering many Toubou homeless. Several dozens who protested the destruction were arrested, and families who refused to leave their homes were beaten.

In the Libyan Civil War, Toubou tribespeople in Libya sided with the rebel anti-Gaddafi forces and participated in the Fezzan campaign against forces loyal to Muammar Gaddafi, briefly capturing the town of Qatrun and claiming to capture Murzuk for the rebel movement a month later.

In March 2012, bloody clashes broke out between Toubou and Arab tribesmen in the southern city of Sabha, Libya. In response, Issa Abdel Majid Mansour, the leader of the Toubou tribe in Libya threatened a separatist bid, decrying what he saw as "ethnic cleansing" against Toubou and declaring "We announce the reactivation of the Toubou Front for the Salvation of Libya to protect the Toubou people from ethnic cleansing." The TFSL was the opposition group active in the unrest of 2007–2008 that was "ruthlessly persecuted" by the Gaddafi government.

See also
Demographics of Chad
Demographics of Niger
Demographics of Libya

References

 
Ethnic groups in Chad
Ethnic groups in Libya
Ethnic groups in Niger
African nomads
People of the Chadian–Libyan War
Muslim communities in Africa